William "Billy" Schober (born 14 November 1956) is an Australian former competitive figure skater. He is a six-time Australian national champion, representing Victoria. He competed at five World Championships and the 1976 Winter Olympics in Innsbruck, Austria. He placed 20th in the compulsory figures at the Olympics before withdrawing.

Competitive highlights

References 

1956 births
Australian male single skaters
Figure skaters at the 1976 Winter Olympics
Living people
Olympic figure skaters of Australia